The Leibniz Society of North America is a philosophical society whose purpose is to promote the study of the philosophy of Gottfried Wilhelm Leibniz. The society publishes The Leibniz Review, organizes an annual conference, sponsors group sessions at meetings of the American Philosophical Association, holds an annual essay contest, and issues an annual newsletter.

References

External links 
Official site
Listing at erraticimpact.com
Membership Services

Gottfried Wilhelm Leibniz
Philosophical societies
1900 establishments in the United States